Chiloglanis kazumbei is a species of upside-down catfish found in Tanzania, where it occurs in the lower Malagarasi River and the Luiche River; it has also been seen in affluents of Malagarazi in Burundi. This species grows to a length of  SL.

References

Further reading

External links 

kazumbei
Freshwater fish of Africa
Fish of Tanzania
Endemic fauna of Tanzania
Fish described in 2011